Levassor Nunatak is a conspicuous horseshoe-shaped nunatak  inland in the middle of Cugnot Ice Piedmont, Trinity Peninsula, Antarctica. It was mapped from surveys by the Falkland Islands Dependencies Survey (1960–61), and was named by the UK Antarctic Place-Names Committee for French engineer Émile Levassor, who in 1891 was jointly responsible with René Panhard for a motor car design which originated the principles on which most subsequent developments were based.

Location
German-British mapping in 1996.

Map
 Trinity Peninsula. Scale 1:250000 topographic map No. 5697. Institut für Angewandte Geodäsie and British Antarctic Survey, 1996.

References

Nunataks of Trinity Peninsula